Slauson station is an elevated light rail station on the A Line of the Los Angeles Metro Rail system. The station is located within the historic right-of-way of the Pacific Electric Railway and elevated over the intersection of Slauson Avenue, after which the station is named, in the unincorporated Los Angeles County community of Florence.

The station is on a long viaduct that carries the A Line over the Union Pacific freight railroad's Wilmington Subdivision and its junction with the La Habra Subdivision.

Passengers may use Los Angeles Metro Bus route  to travel between the two stations.

This station will be the eastern trailhead of the Rail-to-Rail Route bike path.

History 

The Slauson station was built on the site of a major junction of the Pacific Electric Railway's Southern Division, where the Whittier, Fullerton, and La Habra lines split off from the Watts, Long Beach, San Pedro, and Balboa lines. This was called Slauson Junction.

The station is also planned to be served by the proposed light rail West Santa Ana Branch Transit Corridor, with service starting as early as 2033.

Service

Station layout

Hours and frequency

Connections 
, the following connections are available:
Los Angeles Metro Bus: 
LADOT DASH: Pueblo Del Rio

Notable places nearby 
The station is within walking distance of the following notable places:
 Augustus F. Hawkins Natural Park

References

A Line (Los Angeles Metro) stations
Railway stations in the United States opened in 1990
1990 establishments in California
Pacific Electric stations